Almir Moraes de Albuquerque (28 October 1937 – 6 February 1973), known as Almir Pernambuquinho, was a Brazilian footballer who played for clubs of Brazil, Argentina and Italy. Almir Pernambuquinho is, by many considered, the inventor of the fute-vôlei. He played for the Brazil national football team in the Copa América Argentina 1959. He was killed in a bar in 1973.

Titles by club

Santos
 Campeonato Paulista: 1 (1965)
 Rio – São Paulo Championship: 2 (1963 and 1964)
 Brazil Cup: 2 (1963 and 1964)
 Copa Libertadores de América: 1 (1963)
 Internacontinental Cup: 1 (1963)

Vasco da Gama
 Campeonato Carioca: 1 (1958)

Boca Juniors
 Primera División Argentina: 1 (1962)

Titles by Brazil national football team

Brazil
 Taça do Atlântico: 1 (1960 VS Argentina)
 Roca Cup: 1 (1960 VS Argentina)

References

External links
 
 

1937 births
1973 deaths
Brazilian footballers
Brazilian expatriate footballers
Brazil international footballers
Sport Club do Recife players
Santos FC players
CR Vasco da Gama players
Sport Club Corinthians Paulista players
CR Flamengo footballers
America Football Club (RJ) players
Genoa C.F.C. players
ACF Fiorentina players
Boca Juniors footballers
Argentine Primera División players
Expatriate footballers in Argentina
Expatriate footballers in Italy
Association football forwards
Sportspeople from Recife